The A6 disappearances (French: disparues de l'A6, literally the "[female] disappeared of the A6") is the name given to a number of mysterious disappearances or other crimes involving women and girls, occurring in the 1980s, 1990s and 2000s along a 200-kilometer (120-mile) stretch of the A6 motorway around Mâcon, Chalon-sur-Saône and Montceau-les-Mines, France. The area has been informally referred to as the "triangle of fear" (French: triangle de la peur).

The crimes took place between 22 August 1984 and 2 April 2005. Although the police have solved some of the murders, they are unsure of whether the remaining unsolved cases are coincidences or the work of one or more serial killers.

The victims 
All known victims were females aged between 13 and 37 who disappeared suddenly in the département of Saône-et-Loire in east-central France, all along a 200 km stretch of the A6 in a "triangle of fear" between Mâcon, Chalon-sur-Saône and Montceau-les-Mines.

Christelle Maillery
Christelle Maillery was murdered in December 1986 and was the fourth woman to disappear. In 1990, the examining magistrate ruled that her case would be closed. According to French news magazine Le Nouvel Observateur, evidence such as the "victim's clothes, jewelry and a knife" that were found 200 meters from the crime scene were destroyed by the forensics unit of the tribunal de grande instance (roughly equivalent to a Crown Court) in Chalon-sur-Saône. No progress was made in the case until 2003, when a private detective working for the Association Christelle obtained the witness testimony of Christelle's ex-boyfriend, reinvigorating the case. The boyfriend stated that after the murder, a man named Jean-Pierre Mura offered him 300 euros in "compensation" for the death of his girlfriend. The boyfriend found this unbelievable and so never reported it. Following the murder of Christelle Maillery in 1986, the support group Association Christelle was formed, and now comprises 11 member families. The group stated that its aim is to provide support to families victims of criminal violence.

Carole Soltysiak
The seventh person to disappear was 13-year-old Carole Soltysiak. Hunters discovered her naked and partially burned body in a forest near Montceau-les-Mines. According to the Gazette de Côte-d'Or newspaper, "She had been stabbed four times in the chest. However, evidence suggests that strangulation may be the true cause of death". The autopsy revealed that she had been intoxicated before being assaulted. Isolated traces of semen were found on her body. The semen however contained no spermatozoa, meaning her attacker was infertile. The DNA was neither a match to serial killer Francis Heaulme nor to two other suspects who were known to be in the area at the time.

Virginie Bluzet
The ninth victim was Virginie Bluzet, a 21-year-old from Beaune who disappeared in February 1997, a few months after Christelle Blétry. Bluzet's body was found on 17 March 1997 on the banks of the river Saône in Verdun-sur-le-Doubs, having spent five weeks in the water. She had been found bound and gagged, and her head had been covered by a pillow. The investigation into her death was relaunched in February 2010, following advances in forensic technology. Dijon police had investigated Bluzet's boyfriend, but the magistrate closed this line of inquiry on 6 November 2002 due to a lack of evidence. Michel Bluzet, Virginie's father, stated: "A spot of blood was found on the gag, and despite all the years that have passed, we know that more evidence can be found; I've got my fingers crossed."

Vanessa Theillon
The body of 17-year-old apprentice chef Vanessa Theillon was found in 1999, on the banks of the Saône in Mâcon. She had been violently beaten and had died from an overdose. She did not appear to have been sexually assaulted.

Anne-Sophie Girollet
20-year-old medical student Anne-Sophie Girollet disappeared on 19 March 2005, after a dance gala in Mâcon. Girollet obtained her baccalauréat at 17 and was already in her third year at medical school in Lyon. Her body was found floating in the Saône on 2 April that year, near a bridge in Mâcon. The medical examiners concluded that she had been sexually assaulted before being strangled, suffocating as a result of being stabbed in the chest.

Convictions

Jacky Martin: Anne-Sophie Girollet 
Jacky Martin, a man who was already on the FNAEG (France's DNA database) due to convictions for violent crimes, theft and handling stolen vehicles, was arrested in 2012 after his car, a Peugeot 405 registered to the Rhône département (where Lyon is located), was fished from the Saône and found to contain genetic traces of Anne-Sophie Girollet. Martin was sentenced to 30 years' imprisonment (to serve a minimum of 20 years before being considered for parole) for the abduction and murder of Anne-Sophie Girollet. He has appealed the verdict.

Jean-Pierre Mura: Christelle Maillery 
The judicial inquiry into Christelle Maillery's murder was officially reopened in 2005. Jean-Pierre Mura, then aged 44, was arrested and questioned. Dozens of knives were discovered at his home. Their blades were compared to the blade of the knife found at the crime scene (the knife itself had been destroyed, but photographs of it still existed). "The blades seized and the blade in the photograph had been sharpened by the same grinder and by the same person or persons." The expert's report highlighted "four common points featuring sharpening marks" that had been made by the grinder, similar to the manner in which ballistics experts compare traces that a bullet leaves the barrel of the gun from which it is fired. These facts, as well as witness statements, led to the magistrate charging the suspect with murder (known in French law as "voluntary homicide") on 15 December 2011. He was held on remand at the prison in Varennes-le-Grand.

Before his arrest by the Dijon Judicial Police, Mura had been held in a psychiatric hospital near Chalon-sur-Saône. At the request of a close relative and on medical advice, he had been detained under mental health legislation at a hospital in Sevrey by way of a decree from the prefect of the département. In December 1986, Mura, then a 19-year-old metalworker from the nearby town of Le Creusot, was already a father to a young daughter. He spent most of his time loitering around an impoverished block of flats called Les Charmilles, near the council estate where Christelle Maillery lived. As a teenager, Mura had taken part in burglaries from basements of properties on the estate. He was also known to take drugs and drink a lot of alcohol. Mura was sentenced to 20 years' imprisonment by the Court of Assizes in Chalon-sur-Saône. He appealed the sentence to the Court of Appeal in Dijon, but this court agreed with the original sentence handed down, despite believing that Mura was showing early stages of schizophrenia when he committed the murder.

See also
List of fugitives from justice who disappeared
List of solved missing person cases

References 

1980s missing person cases
1990s missing person cases
2000s missing person cases
Formerly missing people
French murder victims
Incidents of violence against girls
Incidents of violence against women
Missing person cases in France
Murdered French children
Serial murders in France
Unidentified serial killers
1980s road incidents in Europe
1990s road incidents in Europe
2000s road incidents in Europe